Jennifer Capriati and Monica Seles were the defending champions, but competed this year with different partners.

Capriati teamed up with Mary Joe Fernández and lost in the second round to Florencia Labat and Sandrine Testud.

Seles teamed up with Helena Suková and successfully defended her title, by defeating Katerina Maleeva and Barbara Rittner 6–1, 6–2 in the final.

Seeds
The first four seeds received a bye to the second round.

Draw

Finals

Top half

Bottom half

References

External links
 Official results archive (ITF)
 Official results archive (WTA)

Women's Doubles
1992 WTA Tour